The North railway is a two-track, electrified railway line that runs from Vienna, Austria to Břeclav, Czech Republic. It was built by the Emperor Ferdinand North Railway company as a part of the Warsaw-Vienna railway.

External links 
 

Railway lines in Austria
Railway lines in the Czech Republic

pl:Kolej Północna